Orthetrum boumiera is a freshwater dragonfly species in the family Libellulidae,
 
endemic to eastern Australia,
where it inhabits dune lakes.
The common name for this species is brownwater skimmer.

Orthetrum boumiera is a medium-sized, yellow dragonfly with black markings. Adult males develop an extensive blue pruinescence, while females will become slightly pruinescent.

Etymology
The species name boumiera is a toponym derived from the Aboriginal name, Bummiera, for Brown Lake on North Stradbroke Island, in Queensland, Australia. University of Queensland students first collected specimens of this species in the Bummiera area on North Stradbroke Island.

Gallery

See also
 List of Odonata species of Australia

References

Libellulidae
Odonata of Australia
Endemic fauna of Australia
Taxa named by J.A.L. (Tony) Watson
Taxa named by Angela H. Arthington
Insects described in 1978